Zandre Labuschagne (born ) is a South African female artistic gymnast, representing her nation at international competitions.  

She participated at the 2004 Summer Olympics, and the 2003 World Artistic Gymnastics Championships.

References

1986 births
Living people
South African female artistic gymnasts
Place of birth missing (living people)
Gymnasts at the 2004 Summer Olympics
Olympic gymnasts of South Africa